Harouna Diarra (born 26 October 1978) is a Malian former professional footballer who played as a midfielder.

Career
Diarra played for OFI Crete in the Greek Alpha Ethniki from 1997 to 1999. He later played for Naoussa F.C., Panelefsiniakos F.C. and Kalamata F.C. in the Greek Beta Ethniki.

Diarra made a few appearances for the Mali national football team, including 2000 African Cup of Nations qualifiers.

References

External links

Living people
1978 births
Association football midfielders
Malian footballers
Mali international footballers
AS Real Bamako players
OFI Crete F.C. players
Naoussa F.C. players
Panelefsiniakos F.C. players
Paniliakos F.C. players
Kalamata F.C. players
Stade Malien players
Malian expatriate footballers
Malian expatriate sportspeople in Greece
Expatriate footballers in Greece
21st-century Malian people